Werner I, Bishop of Strasbourg was bishop of Strasbourg. He died on 28 October 1028.

References

Year of birth uncertain
10th-century births
1028 deaths
Bishops of Strasbourg